Patricia ("Trish") Joan Davies (born December 5, 1956) is a former field hockey player from Zimbabwe, who was a member of the national team that won the gold medal at the 1980 Summer Olympics in Moscow.

Because of the boycott by the United States and other countries, only one team was available to compete in the Women's Field Hockey Tournament: the hosting USSR team. A late request was sent to the government of the African nation, which quickly assembled a team less than a week before the competition started. To everyone's surprise they won, claiming Zimbabwe's only medal in the 1980 Games.

She coached the Zimbabwe national team at the 2022 Women's Hockey Africa Cup of Nations. She coached the Zimbabwe women's junior is 2016 as 2016 Women's Hockey Junior World Cup and 2016 Women's Junior Africa cup for Nations.

References

sports-reference

External links

1956 births
Living people
Zimbabwean female field hockey players
Olympic field hockey players of Zimbabwe
Field hockey players at the 1980 Summer Olympics
Olympic gold medalists for Zimbabwe
Olympic medalists in field hockey
Medalists at the 1980 Summer Olympics
White Zimbabwean sportspeople